The City of Singapore existed between 1951 and 1965 in the Colony of Singapore, a British Crown colony and later in the State of Singapore within Malaysia, with the City Council as the governing authority. Before 1951, the City Council was known as the Municipal Commission. The rest of the crown colony was under the authority of the Singapore Rural Board.

History

Creation and subsequent elections
In the 1948 and 1951 general elections in Singapore, constituencies were drawn along the boundary of the Municipal Commission and the Rural Board, each area was subdivided into a number of constituencies.

The municipality was then conferred with city status by a Royal charter from King George VI on 22 September 1951, when Singapore was then a Crown colony. The original Municipal Commission was therefore renamed as the City Council, and the Municipal Building was renamed City Hall.

Between the 1957 election and the phasing out of the city, Ong Eng Guan of the People's Action Party (PAP) was the mayor as the leader of the largest party within the City Council. Ong went on to become Minister of National Development under Lee Kuan Yew's premiership.

Dissolution
After the PAP gained power following the 1959 general election and formed the first government after self-government was granted to the Crown colony, the city was phased out, with powers transferred to statutory boards.

In 1965, upon Singapore's expulsion from Malaysia, the Republic of Singapore Independence Act 1965 provided the following clause which empowered the President to abolish the City Council and the Rural Board, with the powers of the local authorities assumed by the Government.

Legacy
Today, the Central Area, which sits in the south-eastern corner of Singapore, mostly corresponds with what was once the City of Singapore.

See also 
 Cities in Malaysia
 City status in the United Kingdom
 George Town, Penang

References 

History of Singapore
States and territories established in 1951
States and territories disestablished in 1965